Russ Klabough (born May 11, 1990) is an American soccer player who currently plays for FC Arizona.

Career

College and Amateur
Klabough played two years of college soccer at California State University, Stanislaus between 2014 and 2015. In 2016, Klabough played with Premier Development League sides Burlingame Dragons and Midland/Odessa Sockers FC.

Professional
On February 17, 2017, Klabough signed a professional contract with USL club Reno 1868. Klabough was released by Reno on December 3, 2018.

On 14 December 2018, Klabough signed with FC Arizona.

References

External links
 

1990 births
Living people
American soccer players
Association football goalkeepers
Burlingame Dragons FC players
Midland-Odessa Sockers FC players
People from Sierra Vista, Arizona
Reno 1868 FC players
FC Arizona players
Soccer players from Arizona
Stanislaus State Warriors men's soccer players
USL Championship players
USL League Two players
National Premier Soccer League players